Mary of Marion Isle is a 1929 novel by H Rider Haggard. It was his penultimate novel and was published posthumously. Haggard originally came up with the idea for the novel in 1916 while on travelling on a ship from South Africa to Australia and glancing at the islands they passed on the way there.

References

External links
Complete book at Free Read

Novels by H. Rider Haggard
1929 British novels
Novels published posthumously
Novels set in South Africa
Hutchinson (publisher) books
Doubleday, Doran books